SM UB-35 was a German Type UB II submarine or U-boat in the German Imperial Navy during World War I. The U-boat was ordered on 22 July 1915 and launched on 28 December 1915. She was commissioned into the German Imperial Navy on 22 June 1916 as SM UB-35.

The submarine sank 42 ships in 26 patrols. UB-35 was depth charged and sunk by British warships including  in the English Channel on 26 January 1918.

Design
A German Type UB II submarine, UB-35 had a displacement of  when at the surface and  while submerged. The submarine was powered by two Benz six-cylinder diesel engines producing a total , two Siemens-Schuckert electric motors producing , and one propeller shaft.

UB-35 was fitted with two  torpedo tubes, four torpedoes, and one  Uk L/30 deck gun. She had a complement of twenty-one crew members and two officers and a 42-second dive time.

Summary of raiding history

Notes

References

Bibliography 

 

1915 ships
Ships built in Hamburg
World War I submarines of Germany
German Type UB II submarines
U-boats commissioned in 1916
Maritime incidents in 1918
U-boats sunk in 1918
U-boats sunk by depth charges
U-boats sunk by British warships
World War I shipwrecks in the English Channel